Carthade is a genus of moths of the family Crambidae. It contains only one species, Carthade caecalis, which is found in Colombia.

References

Spilomelinae
Crambidae genera
Taxa named by Pieter Cornelius Tobias Snellen
Monotypic moth genera